Bengt Johan Axgren (born 5 March 1975) is a Swedish professional golfer.

Axgren was born in Gothenburg. He turned professional in 1995.

Axgren has won four times on the Challenge Tour, the first in 1996, and then once in 2004 and twice more in 2006, when he finished second on the end of season money list, to graduate to the European Tour for the 2007 season. He did not win sufficient money during that season to retain his tour card, and returned to the Challenge Tour the following season.

On 7 May 2006, Axgren achieved a career highest world ranking of 189.

Professional wins (6)

Challenge Tour wins (4)

1Co-sanctioned by the Tour de las Américas

Challenge Tour playoff record (1–1)

Swedish Golf Tour wins (1)

Other wins (1)
2001 Lear Open Silfverschiöldspokalen (Swedish mini-tour)

See also
2006 Challenge Tour graduates
List of golfers with most Challenge Tour wins

References

External links

Swedish male golfers
European Tour golfers
Sportspeople from Gothenburg
1975 births
Living people
21st-century Swedish people